Grigori Aleksandrovich Chirkin (born 26 February 1986) is a Russian former professional footballer. He played as a defensive midfielder.

Career
He made his debut for the main squad of FC Lokomotiv Moscow on 12 November 2005 in the Russian Cup game against FC Metallurg-Kuzbass Novokuznetsk.

He appeared in every game in the 2009–10 UEFA Europa League group stage for the Latvian club FK Ventspils which was making its debut in the group stages of European competitions.

On 2 July 2014, Chirkin signed a two-year contract with Anzhi Makhachkala.

After spending the first 12 seasons of his career mostly in the second-tier Russian Football National League (other than portions of two seasons spent in Czech top division), he made his Russian Premier League debut for FC Orenburg on 28 July 2018 in a game against FC Spartak Moscow. He returned to the FNL after one season on the top level.

References

External links
 
 

1986 births
Sportspeople from Novosibirsk
Living people
Russian footballers
Russia youth international footballers
Association football midfielders
FC Lokomotiv Moscow players
FC SKA Rostov-on-Don players
FC Sibir Novosibirsk players
FK Rīga players
FC Dynamo Barnaul players
FK Ventspils players
SK Dynamo České Budějovice players
FC Baltika Kaliningrad players
FC Anzhi Makhachkala players
FC Tosno players
FC Orenburg players
FC Avangard Kursk players
FC Dynamo Bryansk players
Russian First League players
Latvian Higher League players
Czech First League players
Russian Premier League players
Russian Second League players
Russian expatriate footballers
Expatriate footballers in Latvia
Russian expatriate sportspeople in Latvia
Expatriate footballers in the Czech Republic
Russian expatriate sportspeople in the Czech Republic